Werner Baer (May 6, 1931 – March 31, 2016) was an American economist at the University of Illinois Urbana-Champaign and the Jorge Lemann Professor of Economics.  He received his bachelor's degree from CUNY Queens College in 1953, and a Master's and a Ph.D. from Harvard University in 1955 and 1958 respectively.  His research centered on Latin America's industrialization and economic development, especially of Import Substitution Industrialization (ISI) and Brazil.

Baer's research and writing focused primarily on the areas of industrialization, growth and economic development, public policy, inflation, and income distribution and equity.

He had a distinguished record of scholarly achievement, including such books as Industrialization and Economic Development in Brazil (1965), The Development of the Brazilian Steel Industry (1970) The Brazilian Economy: Its Growth and Development (1979), now in its sixth edition, as well as a lengthy stream of articles on a diverse range of economic and policy issues.

One of the unique aspects of Baer's work is the link he makes between historical, social, and institutional legacies of the Brazilian past and his direct and ongoing engagement with the most current issues of economic and public policy.

He served on the editorial boards of the Luso-Brazilian Review, Emerging Markets Review, Economia Aplicada, Latin American Business Review, Revista Latinoamericana de Historica Economica y Social, Revista Paraguaya de Estudios Sociologicos, Latin American Research Review, and World Development.

He taught at Yale (1961–65), Vanderbilt (1965–74), and the University of Illinois (1974–2016), and he served as a program advisor for the Ford Foundation in Rio de Janeiro from 1967 to 1976. He encouraged large numbers of young people to enter Brazilian studies and recruited many, from both the United States and Brazil, to undertake doctoral studies in economics under his direction.

Baer's multiple contributions have been widely recognized in Brazil. He received the prestigious Rio Branco Medal from the Brazilian Ministry of Foreign Affairs (December 2000), the Medalha de Honra da Inconfidência from the state of Minas Gerais (1995), and the National Order of the Southern Cross from the government of Brazil (1982).

Carlos Alberto Braga, an economist at The World Bank, notes that not only does Baer's analysis of Latin American economic development occupy a well-deserved place in the economic literature dedicated to the region but also that he was a highly influential thinker and researcher. This is because he was responsible for establishing one of the largest networks of those interested in the economies of Latin American. His impact on debates about Latin America's economic experience goes well beyond his writings. Rafael Correa, the former president of Ecuador, and Alexandre Tombini, former president of the Brazilian Central Bank, were advised by Baer during their time at Illinois.

His book, The Brazilian Economy: Growth and Development, is one of the only comprehensive studies in English of all aspects of Brazil's economic development, and is currently in its 7th edition.

He served as a visiting lecturer at the Pontifical Catholic University of Rio de Janeiro, Brazil as well as the New University of Lisbon, Portugal. He also served as an assistant professor at Yale and an instructor at Harvard.

Werner Baer died after a sudden and brief illness on March 31, 2016.

References

Other information
 
 
 The Brazilian Economy:Development and Growth
 CV
 Brazilian television interview (in Portuguese)
 Brazilian television interview (in Portuguese)

1931 births
2016 deaths
American development economists
Harvard Graduate School of Arts and Sciences alumni
University of Illinois Urbana-Champaign faculty
Brazilianists
Economic historians